Marina 101 is a skyscraper in Dubai, United Arab Emirates, located in the Dubai Marina district. As of 2022, Marina 101 is also the 32nd-tallest building in the world. 

Construction began in 2007, with completion initially scheduled for 2014. The building remains incomplete after the original developer - Sheffield Holdings Limited - ran out of capital. The building was designed by National Engineering Bureau and construction was by Turkish conglomerate TAV Construction.

The first 33 floors of the skyscraper are designed to host a 5-star Hard Rock hotel with 281 rooms, while the floors from 34 to 100 have residential apartments. Apart from five restaurants in the hotel tower, there are 252 one-bedroom, 204 two-bedroom, and 42 three-bedroom apartments with 6 duplex penthouses from the 97th to the 100th floor. The 101st floor of the skyscraper features a club lounge, restaurant and a Rock Shop merchandise store.

Gallery

See also
 List of tallest buildings
 List of tallest buildings in the United Arab Emirates
 List of tallest buildings in Dubai
 List of buildings with 100 floors or more
 Marina 106

References

External links

 Sheffield Holdings Website
 Marina101.net
 Marina 101 CTBUH Skyscraper Database

Condo hotels
Residential skyscrapers in Dubai
High-tech architecture
Postmodern architecture
Condominiums in the United Arab Emirates
Skyscraper hotels in Dubai